Ophiusa violascens  is a moth of the family Erebidae. It is found in Africa, including South Africa.

References

Endemic moths of South Africa
Ophiusa
Moths described in 1902